James Stuart  (12 July 1774 – 6 April 1833) was a British politician.

Stuart was one of four illegitimate children of William Stuart, 9th Baron Blantyre and Harriet Teasdale. He joined the British East India Company in 1791 as a writer (junior clerk) in Bengal, and rose to become a director of the East India Company from 1826 until his death.

He was a Member of Parliament (MP) for Huntingdon from 1822 to 1831.

References 
 

1774 births
1833 deaths
Members of the Parliament of the United Kingdom for English constituencies
UK MPs 1820–1826
UK MPs 1826–1830
UK MPs 1830–1831
Directors of the British East India Company